Sidi Touré (born 1959, Gao, Mali) is a singer/songwriter from Bamako, Mali. His music is a type of songhaï blues. He started his career in the Sonhaï Stars, a regional orchestra. In 1984 he won the award of best singer with a song of his own hand at a Mali National Biennale. He won the same prize again in 1986. In 1992 he collaborated with Kassemady Diabaté.

Outside Mali, Sidi Touré is mainly known for his appearance in Vincent Moon's Take-Away Show series of videos. Moon filmed the Malian musician on location in Mali.

Discography
 Hoga, 1996, Stern's Records
 Sahel Folk, 2011, Thrill Jockey Records
 Koïma, 2012, Thrill Jockey Records
 Alafia, 2013
 Toubalbero, 2018
 Afrik Toun Mé, 2020, Thrill Jockey Records

References
Bio on The African Music Guide by Frank Bessem

External links
 Sidi Touré on Myspace (official website)
Sidi Touré in the Take-Away Show
HOGA at Sterns Records

1959 births
Living people
People from Bamako
People from Gao
Malian guitarists
21st-century Malian male singers
20th-century Malian male singers